Nesquehoning is a borough in Carbon County, Pennsylvania, United States. It is part of Northeastern Pennsylvania. The population was 3,336 at the 2020 census. 

Nesquehoning was established as a result of the anthracite coal mining industry. It was incorporated as a borough in 1963 (effective in 1964), having previously been a part of Mauch Chunk Township west of the Lehigh River. The borough's name is of Native American origin, commonly believed to signify "narrow valley;" however native language scholars translate the name as "at the black lick" or "at the dirty lick," referring to mineral licks frequented by deer or other animals.

History
The former Nesquehoning High School was added to the National Register of Historic Places in 2003.
The Grotto, Our Lady of Lourdes Shrine at the Shrine of St. Therese of Lisieux in New Columbus, Nesquehoning, PA is listed as a Traditional Cultural Property at the US National Register of Historic Places

Geography
Nesquehoning is located at  (40.868178, -75.824176). The hardiness zone is 6a.

Neighborhoods
Nesquehoning can be roughly divided into four neighborhoods:

Nesquehoning Village - This neighborhood is located in the southeastern section of the Borough with the Nesquehoning Creek serving as its northern border. More than half of the Borough's residents live in this neighborhood.

New Columbus - This neighborhood includes the area north of the Nesquehoning Creek, opposite Nesquehoning Village. The second largest neighborhood in terms of the number of people next to the Nesquehoning neighborhood, development of the New Columbus neighborhood was a result of relocating the Little Italy section of Nesquehoning.

Old Hauto - This neighborhood is in the southwestern section of the Borough, at the base of Nesquehoning Mountain to the south. It is bordered by the Nesquehoning Creek and the former Nesquehoning Valley Railroad (now owned by the County of Carbon) on the north. There are two hamlets or housing clusters in this neighborhood. One is the historical Old Hauto Village area, which is located in the west along PA State Route 54. The other housing cluster is a subdivision development located in the easterly part of the neighborhood between PA Route 54 and Park Avenue. It was developed beginning in the late 1960s and is known locally as Hauto Valley Estates.

Lake Hauto - This neighborhood is a lakeside resort type community situated on the northern side of Lake Hauto. Lake Hauto is a private community. Although often thought of as being in Nesquehoning, the majority of the Lake Hauto community is actually located in neighboring Rush Township, Schuylkill County.

Demographics

As of the census of 2010, there were 3,349 people, 1,440 households, and 864 families residing in the borough. The population density was 155.04 people per square mile (60.0/km2). There were 1,701 housing units at an average density of 78.75 per square mile (29.2/km2). The racial makeup of the borough was 96.7% White, 1.2%  African American, 0.24% Native American, 0.06% Asian, 0.95% from other races, and 0.90% from two or more races. Hispanic or Latino of any race were 2.4% of the population.

There were 1,440 households, of which 25.0% had children under the age of 18 living with them, 48.9% were married couples living together, 10.5% had a female householder with no husband present, and 36.2% were non-families. 32.0% of all households were made up of individuals, and 17.6% had someone living alone who was 65 years of age or older. The average household size was 2.30 and the average family size was 2.89.

In the borough the population was spread over all age groups, with 18.8% under the age of 18, 8.3% from 18 to 24, 28.7% from 25 to 44, 23.0% from 45 to 64, and 21.3% who were 65 years of age or older. The median age was 41 years. For every 100 females, there were 98.9 males. For every 100 females age 18 and over, there were 96.3 males.

The median income for a household in the borough was $35,902, and the median income for a family was $41,855. Males had a median income of $30,417 versus $19,291 for females. The per capita income for the borough was $16,820. About 2.0% of families and 9.7% of the population were below the poverty line, including 3.0% of those under age 18 and 23.4% of those age 65 or over.

Lake Hauto was built for a power plant. The dam was built  to cool off the generators but by the 1970s the power plant was not efficient, so  as a result the plant closed down in mid 1977.Today Lake Hauto is a private lake community.

Economy 
Nesquehoning is the former home of KME Corp, which was the largest employer in the borough for many decades until operations ceased in early 2022. The company, a division of REV Group, manufactures custom-built fire fighting vehicles for a variety of markets worldwide, and other specialty heavy-duty vehicles, including aircraft refuelers. At its peak, the company employed approximately 1,000 people in Nesquehoning, providing many jobs for the area. REV Group announced in late 2021 that they will be closing the factory in town, leaving approximately 400 out of work.

ConEdison Development has built one of the state's largest solar energy plants in Nesquehoning. Green Energy Capital Partners, Conshohocken, Pennsylvania developed the project.  The 11 megawatt photovoltaic solar energy plant was completed in 2012, and covers approximately 90 acres near the Green Acres Industrial Park.  The power plant consists of approximately 40,000 solar panels, and produces enough energy to power about 1,500 homes.

Education
The residents of Nesquehoning are served by the Panther Valley School District. Some of the residents of Nesquehoning may also be served by a private school, Marian Catholic High School, which accommodates students in grades 9-12 and is located near Tamaqua, Pennsylvania. Preceding schools of Marian is Our Lady of the Angels which houses grades K-8.

Transportation

U.S. Route 209 is the most prominent highway serving Nesquehoning. It follows Market Street and Catawissa Street along a southwest-northeast alignment through the southern and eastern parts of the borough. Pennsylvania Route 54 begins at US 209 and follows Stock Street southwestward. Pennsylvania Route 93 also begins at US 209, following Hunter Street northwestward.

Notable people 
Gene Snitsky, former professional wrestler

Climate
Humid continental climate is a climatic region typified by large seasonal temperature differences, with warm to hot (and often humid) summers and cold (sometimes severely cold) winters.  The Köppen Climate Classification subtype for this climate is "Dfa" (Hot Summer Continental Climate).

References

External links

Nesquehoning information site
City Data for Nesquehoning
News on Solar Energy Project

Populated places established in 1827
Boroughs in Carbon County, Pennsylvania
1827 establishments in Pennsylvania